Mulberry Creek is a short tributary of the Tennessee River in Colbert County in northern Alabama in the United States. The stream enters the Pickwick Lake portion of the Tennessee River from the southwest. The confluence is three miles east of Cherokee and the stream crosses US Route 72 about two miles west of Barton.

References

External links
 Google Map of Mulberry Creek

Rivers of Alabama
Florence–Muscle Shoals metropolitan area
Tributaries of the Tennessee River
Rivers of Colbert County, Alabama